KBRZ (1460 kHz) is a commercial AM radio station licensed to Missouri City, Texas.  It is operated by Sangeet Radio and owned by Daij Media, LLC.  The station airs a South Asian radio format targeted at the Greater Houston radio market, with listeners originally from India, Pakistan and Bangladesh now living in Southeast Texas.

To offer listeners the choice of hearing the programming on FM radio, KBRZ uses two low-power translator stations:  95.1 K236AR in Missouri City and 103.5 K278CR in Houston.

History

Early Years as Freeport's "K-Breeze"
On October 3, 1952, KBRZ first signed on the air.  It was owned by Brazosport Broadcasting Company and primarily served Brazoria County with local news and sports coverage, and a middle of the road music format.  It was originally a daytimer broadcasting at 500 watts, licensed to Freeport, Texas, and required to sign-off at sunset to protect other radio stations on AM 1460.

In the 1990s, it got authorization to broadcast around the clock, at 214 watts between sunset and sunrise.

Move to Missouri City, Texas
After the death of its owner, J.C. Stallings, the facility was silenced and sold in 2001 to Aleluya Christian Broadcasting, Inc., for $700,000.  The station began carrying Christian programming.  In 2008, Aleluya Broadcasting got FCC permission to move KBRZ closer to Houston, to serve the larger audience in and around that city.  The station was relicensed to Missouri City, Texas.  The daytime power remained at 5,000 watts but the nighttime power was reduced to 125 watts.

In 2017, the station was leased to Saeed Gaddi to air his Sangeet Radio service, specializing in South Asian or "Desi" music and talk.

References

External links
KBRZ official website
KBRZ sports site

BRZ
Brazoria County, Texas
Radio stations established in 1985
1985 establishments in Texas